NE5, or NE-5, or similar may refer to:
 Clarke Quay MRT station, Singapore
 Nebraska's 5th congressional district
 Nebraska Highway 5
 NE5, a postcode district in Newcastle upon Tyne, England; see NE postcode area